Stanley Ocitti (sometimes referred to as Stanley Ochaya Ocitti) (born 28 May 1980) is a Ugandan former professional basketball player.  He played for the Aomori Watts Sports Club of the bj league in Japan. Ocitti is one of Uganda's most prominent basketball figures.

He played most minutes, scored most points and grabbed most rebounds for the Uganda national basketball team at the 2015 FIBA Africa Championship in Radès, Tunisia.

In 2005, Ocitti won the Norwegian championship with Asker Aliens.

College statistics

|-
| style="text-align:left;"| 1998–99
| style="text-align:left;"| UConn
|  ||  ||  ||  ||  ||  ||  ||  ||  ||  || 
|-
| style="text-align:left;"| 1999–00
| style="text-align:left;"|UConn
| 3 ||  ||  || .000 || .000 || .000 || 0.0 || 0.0 || 0.0 || 0.0 || 0.0
|-
| style="text-align:left;"| 2001–02
| style="text-align:left;"| Binghamton
| 24 || 3 || 15.2 || .408 || .371 || .667 || 3.6 || 0.7 || 0.3 || 0.6 || 4.7
|-
| style="text-align:left;"| 2002–03
| style="text-align:left;"| Binghamton
| 27 || 1 || 13.7 || .432 || .395 || .667 || 3.1 || 0.6 || 0.3 || 0.7 || 6.0
|-
|- class="sortbottom"
! style="text-align:center;" colspan="2" | Career

! 54 ||4 || 14.4 ||.420  || .387 ||.667  || 3.2 ||0.6  || 0.3 ||0.6  || 5.1
|-

Career statistics

Regular season 

|-
| align="left" |  2003–04
| align="left" |Den Helder 
| 35 ||  || 16.5 || .357 || .266 || .625 || 3.5 || 0.8 || 1.1 || 0.4 || 5.1
|-
| align="left" |  2005–06
| align="left" |Dombovar  
| 26 ||  || 32.5 || .503 || .439 || .674 || 6.8 || 1.5 || 2.2 || 0.8 || 14.4
|-
| align="left" |  2006–07
| align="left" |Vienna  
| 15 ||  || 29.3 || .486 || .368 || .476 || 7.5 || 1.6 || 0.7 || 0.9 || 10.5
|-
| align="left" |  2008–09
| align="left" |Falco  
| 5 ||  || 18.6 || .333 || .222 || .688 || 7.0 || 1.6 || 1.8 || 0.2 || 6.2
|-
| align="left" |  2008–09
| align="left" | Hamamatsu
| 37 || 37 || 26.5 || .386 || .308 || .621 || 7.9 || 1.5 || 1.3 || 0.5 || 9.6
|-
| align="left" | 2011–12
| align="left" | Akita
| 28 || 25 || 28.5 || .488 || .328 || .657 || 9.3 || 1.4 || 0.9 || 1.2 || 13.1
|-
| align="left" | 2011–12
| align="left" | St John
| 9 || 6 || 27.6 || .393 || .372 || .889 || 6.78 || 1.89 || 1.00 || 1.11 || 10.44
|-
| align="left" | 2012–13
| align="left" | Worcester
| 35 || 28 || 30.9 || .469 || .402 || .831 || 9.14 || 1.69 || 0.69 || 1.09 || 13.97
|-
| align="left" | 2013–14
| align="left" | Aomori
| 34 ||  || 24.5 || .387 || .401 || .677 || 5.8 || 1.1 || 0.6 || 0.5 || 9.5
|-
| align="left" | 2017
| align="left" | Oilers
| 8 ||  || 26.6 || .375 || .404 || 1.000 || 5.8 || 1.3 || 0.9 || 0.4 || 9.4
|-

FIBA Senior Team Events Stats

|-
| style="text-align:left;"|2015
| style="text-align:left;"|AfroBasket
| 5 ||  || 31.11 || .350 || .263 || .538 || 6.4 || 0.6 || 0.8 || 0.4 || 14.6
|-
| style="text-align:left;"|2017
| style="text-align:left;"|AfroBasket
| 3 ||  || 27.07 || .438 || .400 || .500 || 4.3 || 1.3 || 1.3 || 0.3 || 13.0
|-
| style="text-align:left;"|2017
| style="text-align:left;"|African World Cup Qualifier
| 3 ||  || 30.50 || .375 || .300 || 1.000 || 6.0 || 2.7 || 0.7 || 0.3 || 10.3
|-
|- class="sortbottom"
! style="text-align:center;" colspan="2" | Career

! 11 ||   || 29.58 ||.375  || .313 ||.563  || 5.7 ||1.4  || 0.9 ||0.4  || 13.0
|-

International Awards & Honors
British BBL Week 6 Team of the Week First Team - 2012–2013
British BBL Week 7 Team of the Week Honorable Mention - 2012–2013
British BBL Week 8 Team of the Week Honorable Mention - 2012–2013
British BBL Week 10 Team of the Week Honorable Mention - 2012–2013
British BBL Week 18 Team of the Week Honorable Mention - 2012–2013
British BBL Week 20 Team of the Week First Team - 2012–2013
British BBL Week 25 Team of the Week First Team - 2012–2013
British BBL Week 28 Team of the Week Honorable Mention - 2012–2013

Playoffs 

|-
| style="text-align:left;"|2011–12
| style="text-align:left;"|St John
| 2 ||  || 28.0 || .286 || .308 || .000 || 4.5 || 2.0 || 1.5 || 0.5 || 8.0
|-
| style="text-align:left;"|2012–13
| style="text-align:left;"|Worcester
| 2 ||  || 28.5 || .391 || .308 || .000 || 7.5 || 2.0 || 0.5 || 0.5 || 11.0
|-
| style="text-align:left;"|2013–14
| style="text-align:left;"|Aomori
| 2 || 0 || 26.00 || .450 || .200 || .500 || 6.5 || 2.0 || 1.0 || 0 || 10.5
|-

References

External links
FIBA Profile
Afrobasket.com Profile
College stats @ sports-reference.com

1980 births
Living people
Asker Aliens players
Akita Northern Happinets players
Aomori Wat's players
BC Körmend players
BC Zepter Vienna players
Binghamton Bearcats men's basketball players
Cambridge Rindge and Latin School alumni
Centers (basketball)
Den Helder Kings players
Power forwards (basketball)
Saint John Riptide players
San-en NeoPhoenix players
Sportspeople from Kampala
UConn Huskies men's basketball players
Ugandan men's basketball players
Worcester Wolves players